
Year 436 BC was a year of the pre-Julian Roman calendar. At the time, it was known as the Year of the Consulship of Crassus and Cornelius (or, less frequently, year 318 Ab urbe condita). The denomination 436 BC for this year has been used since the early medieval period, when the Anno Domini calendar era became the prevalent method in Europe for naming years.

Events 
 By place 
 Greece 
 Following Pericles' visit to the Black Sea, a large Athenian colony is founded at Amphipolis. This is disconcertingly close to an outpost of Corinthian influence at Potidaea in the Chalcidice. Corinth feels it is being indirectly pressured by Athens.

Births 
 Isocrates, Athenian orator (d. 338 BC)
 Artaxerxes II, king of Persia (approximate date) (d. 358 BC)

Deaths 
 Zengcius, Chinese philosopher (b. 505 BC)

References